Skoppum is a village in the municipality of Horten, Norway. Its population (2005) is 1,633. Skoppum Station on the Vestfold Line is the sole remaining railway station in Horten. It was the site where the Horten Line branched off.

Villages in Vestfold og Telemark